Carlos Clark Van Leer (October 15, 1865 – November 3, 1953) was an American military officer who served in the United States Army during the Spanish-American War and as Chief of the Personnel Classification Board in the United States Department of the Treasury. He was a member of the influential Van Leer family.

Early life and education
Van Leer was born on October 15, 1865 in Nashville, Tennessee to Samuel Van Leer and Alice Clark. He graduated with a degree in law from Vanderbilt University in 1895. He married Harriet Taylor Draper in Washington, Kansas on August 23, 1905. He was a member of the influential Van Leer family and his great-grandfather Samuel Van Leer was a captain in the Continental Army during the American Revolutionary War. His son Anthony Wayne Van Leer also had a long prominent military career as an officer in the Navy.

Career
Van Leer served in the US Army as a First lieutenant and was promoted to captain. He served in the Spanish–American War and returned home to work as a government official running the treasury branch in Tennessee Van Leer served as the assistant director for the Office of Management and Budget and later worked as the Chief of the Personnel Classification Board in the United States Department of the Treasury. Van Leer died on November 3, 1953 and was interred at Arlington National Cemetery.

Citations

1865 births
1953 deaths
Burials at Arlington National Cemetery
Military personnel from Tennessee
People from Nashville, Tennessee
United States Army officers
United States Department of the Treasury officials
Vanderbilt University alumni
Van Leer family